Grand Theft Auto: San Andreas is an open-world, action-adventure video game developed by Rockstar North and published by Rockstar Games. First released on 16 October 2004 for the PlayStation 2, San Andreas has an in-game radio that can tune in to eleven stations playing more than 150 tracks of licensed music, as well as a talk radio station. The songs featured on the radio stations originated in or before the early 1990s, the period in which the game is set.

The game's music has been released on two official soundtracks: Grand Theft Auto: San Andreas Official Soundtrack, released in November 2004, consists of selections from the in-game radio; and Grand Theft Auto: San Andreas Official Soundtrack Box Set, released in December 2004, consists of eight volumes comprising highlights from the game's radio stations. Critical reception to the soundtracks was positive, as reviewers felt that the selected tracks connected appropriately with the gameplay and period.

Albums

Grand Theft Auto: San Andreas Official Soundtrack 

Grand Theft Auto: San Andreas Official Soundtrack features selected tracks from the in-game radio stations. It was released as a three-disc album on November 23, 2004, by Interscope Records. The first two discs featured the songs, while the third disc is a DVD featuring The Introduction, a short machinima video depicting events before the game.

Grand Theft Auto: San Andreas Official Soundtrack Box Set 

Grand Theft Auto: San Andreas Official Soundtrack Box Set comprises highlights from the game's radio stations. The soundtrack was released on December 7, 2004, across eight discs.

References

External links
 Official San Andreas website
 Official San Andreas radio station player

 

2004 compilation albums
2004 soundtrack albums
Soundtrack
San Andreas
Video game music discographies